Vellala or Vellalar may refer to:

 Vellala, a village from the Andhra Pradesh state of India

 Vellalar, a caste originating in Tamil Nadu
 Sri Lankan Tamil Vellalar, the dominant caste of Sri Lankan Tamils
 List of Vellalar sub castes, a list of sub castes

 Isai Vellalar, a new identity for Tamil classical dance and music community created after the merger of minstrel people from certain Tamil castes.

See also
 Vallalar, Hindu saint